Maria Okanrende is a Nigerian television and radio personality.

She co-hosts The Morning Rush on The Beat 99.9 FM. She previously hosted at Dropout UK, Hayes FM and worked as a production assistant at Global Radio.

Early life and education
Okanrende grew up with her parents and her younger sister in London. She graduated from Goldsmiths, University of London with a B.A. honours in English Literature.

Career
Okanrende visited Nigeria at least once a year while she lived in London. After spending some time in Lagos, she decided to permanently move to Nigeria after she got a job in Lagos whilst on vacation.

She auditioned for the Beat FM in 2012 and began co-hosting The Morning Rush show.

She made her acting debut on the season 3 of  MTV's Shuga.

She also hosts a weblog, Maria's Matters!, which airs on her website and YouTube. On the vlog, she's often seen interviewing celebrities on lifestyle and fashion.

Filmography

Television

References

External links

Living people
Nigerian radio people
Television people from London
Alumni of Goldsmiths, University of London
1987 births